Chutine Peak is one of the highest mountains in the Boundary Ranges, a group of subranges of the northern Coast Mountains of British Columbia and Alaska. Chutine Peak lies just east of the Stikine Icecap, and to the north and west of the Stikine River, and south of the basin of the Whiting River. Due to its remoteness, however, it is rarely visited.

The mountain was named in 1980 by the first ascent party for its location near Chutine Lake and Chutine River. Chutine means "the half-people" - half Tlingit and half Tahltan

See also
Geography of British Columbia

References

Boundary Ranges
Stikine Country
Two-thousanders of British Columbia